Sheldon Community School District is a rural public school district headquartered in Sheldon, Iowa.

The district is mostly in O'Brien County with smaller portions in Sioux, Osceola, and Lyon counties. It serves Sheldon, Archer, Ashton, and Matlock, plus the surrounding rural areas.

Cory Myer has been superintendent since 2018.

List of Schools
The district operates three schools, all located in Sheldon:
 East Elementary
 Sheldon Middle School
 Sheldon High School

See also
List of school districts in Iowa

References

External links
 Sheldon Community School District
School districts in Iowa
Education in O'Brien County, Iowa
Education in Sioux County, Iowa
Education in Osceola County, Iowa
Education in Lyon County, Iowa